= Wave properties =

Wave properties may refer to:

- Physical properties of waves: transmission, reflection, polarization, diffraction, refraction and others
- Mathematical description of waves: amplitude, frequency, wavelength, and others
